Mišo Brečko (born 1 May 1984) is a Slovenian former professional footballer who played as a right-back. He spent most of his career in Germany, most notably with 1. FC Köln. At international level, he made 77 appearances for the Slovenia national team, also participating at the 2010 FIFA World Cup.

Club career
Born in Trbovlje, Brečko started his career at Rudar Trbovlje youth sides. During his time at high school, he played few games for Factor in Slovenian Third League. In the 2003–04 season he made 21 appearances for Šmartno in the PrvaLiga. In July 2004 he joined Hamburger SV. He made seven appearances in his first season. In the 2005–06 season he was loaned to Hansa Rostock. In the next season (2006–07), he was loaned to FC Erzgebirge Aue. After two successful seasons in 2. Bundesliga, he played 14 games for HSV during 2007–08 season. He joined 1. FC Köln on free transfer in summer 2008, signing a three-year deal. In 2010 the contract was extended until 2013.

International career
Brečko's first international experience came at the youth level, playing for the Slovenian U17 and U21 teams. He made 15 appearances for the Slovenia U21 team. He made his senior international debut in a friendly match against Slovakia on 17 November 2004 in Trnava. He represented Slovenia at the 2010 FIFA World Cup and gained 77 international appearances.

References

External links
 Slovenian statistics 
 National team profile 
 
 
 

1984 births
Living people
People from Trbovlje
Slovenian footballers
Association football defenders
Slovenia international footballers
Slovenia under-21 international footballers
Slovenia youth international footballers
2010 FIFA World Cup players
NK IB 1975 Ljubljana players
Hamburger SV players
FC Hansa Rostock players
FC Erzgebirge Aue players
1. FC Köln players
1. FC Nürnberg players
Slovenian PrvaLiga players
Bundesliga players
2. Bundesliga players
Slovenian football managers
Slovenian expatriate footballers
Slovenian expatriate sportspeople in Germany
Expatriate footballers in Germany